The Macao Giant Panda Pavilion is a zoo in Seac Pai Van Park, Coloane, Macau, China. The Panda Pavilion is a nature park containing multiple animal species ranging from gorillas, flamingos, monkeys, and of course the famous pandas. Admission is free to see the animals.

Architecture
The pavilion is shaped like a giant fan in an area of 3,000 m2. It consists of indoor activity quarters, outdoor yard and indoor exhibition area.

Facilities
The pavilion is equipped with gift shop.

See also
 List of tourist attractions in Macau

References

External links

 

Coloane
Giant pandas
Tourist attractions in Macau